Valarie Dawn Hope Hodges (born March 12, 1955) is a politician and businessperson from Denham Springs, Louisiana. She is a member of the Republican Party and represents the 64th Congressional District of the Louisiana House of Representatives which includes the rural portions of northwest Livingston Parish and northeast East Baton Rouge parish including the areas of Pride and Watson.

Personal life 
Hodges met her future husband, Leland M. Hodges, while they were both students at Central High School. The two married in 1972 at Amite Baptist Church in Watson. The couple has three children, six grandchildren, and they jointly own and operate two small businesses.

Hodges served as a missionary with her husband for 18 years. Through their work, they established an international ministry that operates churches in Nicaragua and Guadalajara, Mexico. Hodges claims that their international experiences led her to a life of public office through her interactions with "the poverty that accompanies socialistic societies such as Cuba and Mexico."

Political career and controversy 
Hodges was first elected in 2011 to succeed term-limited Representative Bodi White, who was elected to the revamped District 6 seat in the Louisiana State Senate to succeed Julie Quinn. In the 2011 election, Hodges defeated fellow Republican Barry Elkins in the primary election held on October 22, 2011, by receiving over 69 percent of the vote. Hodges election came with the support of the Tea Party movement and former politicians David Vitter and Bobby Jindal.

Hodges first term was characterized by the creation of the Comite River Diversion Canal Project Task Force in 2014. The Task Force sought to study and make recommendations to ensure the completion of the Comite River Diversion Canal project. The Comite River runs through East Baton Rouge Parish where it meets the Amite River south of Denham Springs. The 12-mile Diversion Canal seeks to cut through neighborhoods in north, East Baton Rouge parish to join the Comite River to the Mississippi River to alleviate flooding concerns for residents in Livingston Parish who built their homes in a floodplain. The project has been discussed since the mid-1900s and has been ensnarled by delays ever since.

Despite Hodges's commitment to local infrastructure projects, Hodges political career has also been mixed with far-right extremism. Hodges was an early supporter of the school choice movement involving the creation of a school voucher program to send public school students to private schools for free. Hodges's support persisted for the issue despite questions over the accountability of Louisiana's private school system. However, Hodges quickly withdrew her support on the issue when she learned that parents could use a voucher to send their child to a private, Muslim school. Hodges claimed that such an action by parents would be against the Founding Father's religion despite the fact there is no evidence supporting the claim that these men all followed the same religion or were even all Christian.  Nonetheless, the school voucher expansion program ultimately passed the legislature and was signed by then Governor Jindal. 

Following the 2015 elections, Louisiana faced its worse budgetary crisis in state history as a result of the fiscal policies enacted by Governor Jindal. The state faced a budgetary shortfalls totaling near three billion dollars in John Bel Edwards's first two years as governor putting higher education and healthcare in the political crosshairs. The situation was so dire, public universities throughout the state were considering declaring  financial exigency to absolve them of the problems. Even before this, Louisiana State University was considering cutting over a 1,000 classes to survive. Despite the seriousness of the situation, Hodges repeatedly voted against solutions to the problem and instead supported the same failed policies resulting in the current situation. 

Hodges's extremism is not limited to educational and fiscal issues. When the COVID-19 pandemic took hold across the United States in early 2020, Hodges was a staunch opponent to stay-at-home orders meant to curb the spread of the disease and save lives. Hodges also offered hydroxychloroquine and ivermectin as treatments for the disease despite their being no scientific evidence to support such claims. In the legislative sessions since the onset of the pandemic, Hodges has also been a part of a group legislators pushing for anti-science and anti-vaccine legislation. 

Despite her controversies, Hodges is one of the eight members of the executive committee of the Republican State Executive Committee. Hodges is also a founding member of the Conservative Caucus. She previously served as president of the Livingston Parish Republican Women's Club.

In February 2023, Hodges announced her intentions to run for the 13th Senate District of the Louisiana Senate. Primary elections for the Louisiana Senate race are on October 14, 2023 with a potential run-off slated for November 18. Fellow representative, Buddy Mincey has also announced his intentions to run for the seat being vacated by current Senator Roger Pope.

References 

1955 births
Living people
Republican Party members of the Louisiana House of Representatives
Women state legislators in Louisiana
Women in Louisiana politics
People from Denham Springs, Louisiana
Businesspeople from Louisiana
Baptists from Louisiana
Baptist missionaries from the United States
American expatriates in Mexico
Female Christian missionaries
21st-century American politicians
21st-century American women politicians